The 1996 Columbia Lions football team was an American football team that represented Columbia University during the 1996 NCAA Division I-AA football season. Columbia finished second in the Ivy League. 

In their eighth season under head coach Ray Tellier, the Lions compiled a 8–2 record and outscored opponents 181 to 159. Ryan Gabriele, Randy Murff, Marcellus Wiley and Rory Wilfork were the team captains.  

Despite a 5–2 conference record that placed second in the Ivy League standings, Columbia was outscored 133 to 119 by Ivy opponents. 

Columbia played its homes games at Lawrence A. Wien Stadium in Upper Manhattan, in New York City.

Schedule

Roster

References

Columbia
Columbia Lions football seasons
Columbia Lions football